The Habic (English: "Seven Beeches Creek") is a left tributary of the Mureș river in Transylvania, Romania. It discharges into the Mureș near Petelea.

References

Rivers of Romania
Rivers of Mureș County